Turilli / Lione Rhapsody was an Italian symphonic metal band formed in December 2018, by former Rhapsody of Fire members Luca Turilli and Fabio Lione.  The lineup also included former Rhapsody of Fire members Alex Holzwarth, Patrice Guers, and Dominique Leurquin. Prior to the band's formation, the same lineup performed under the Rhapsody moniker for the 20th Anniversary Farewell Tour, which celebrated 20 years of the original band's existence. On the same day that the band formed, the band started a crowdfunding campaign on Indiegogo to fund their only studio album.

The first intention, after the end of the Rhapsody farewell tour, was to continue with the name Zero Gravity but the promoters strongly recommended that Turilli and Lione continue with the name Rhapsody.

Turilli and Lione branded their new band's music style as a "new generation of symphonic metal" combined with progressive, electronic and even ethnic elements and based on their artistic mantra "Rebirth and Evolution", emphasizing the clear intention to abandon the power metal of their beginnings while evolving their sound into something different, modern and innovative.

At the end of December 2018, Turilli and Lione entered the studio to record their band's only studio album Zero Gravity (Rebirth and Evolution), which was released on July 5, 2019. Following the conclusion of the Latin American tour in January and February 2023 as their final tour, the band disbanded, with an announcement prior that they would be "closing the chapter of their career for good".

Band members
Final line-up
 Luca Turilli – lead guitar, rhythm guitar, keyboards (2018–2023)
 Fabio Lione – lead vocals (2018–2023)
 Dominique Leurquin – rhythm guitar, lead guitar (2018–2023)
 Patrice Guers – bass (2018–2023)
 Alex Holzwarth – drums (2018–2023)

Former live members
 Michele Sanna – drums (2019)
 Fabio Alessandrini – drums (2023)

Discography

Studio albums
 Zero Gravity (Rebirth and Evolution) (2019)

Singles
 "Phoenix Rising" (2019)
 "D.N.A. (Demon and Angel)" (2019)
 "Zero Gravity" (2019)

Music videos
 "Zero Gravity"

References

Italian power metal musical groups
Musical groups established in 2018
Musical groups disestablished in 2023
2018 establishments in Italy